Chioma Chukwuka (born March 12, 1980, also credited as Chioma Chukwuka Akpotha or Chioma Akpotha) is a Nigerian actress, director and movie producer. In 2007, she won the Africa Movie Academy Award for "Best Actress in a leading role" for her performance in the movie "Sins of the flesh", and the Afro Hollywood award for best actress in a lead role in 2010.

Early life 
Chioma Chukwuka was born in Lagos State, on March 12, 1980. She hails from Oraifite in Ekwusigo Local Government Area of Anambra State, Nigeria. She completed her primary education at Onward Nursery and Primary School in Lagos State, and then proceeded to Federal Government Girls College in Onitsha, Anambra State for her secondary education. Chioma then headed to Lagos State University, where she studied Banking and Finance.

Career 

Chioma Chukwuka's acting career began with her debut in the movie "The Apple" in 2000. Chioma also acted in the film The Handkerchief in 2000. In 2007 she received the "Best Actress in a Lead Role" award at the African Movie Academy Awards for the movie Sins of the Flesh. She was also nominated for the African Movie Academy Award for "Best Actress" in the movie "Accident" in 2014. With 20 years of experience, she has starred in more than 350 Nollywood movies, produced 6 movies and have many awards to her credit. As a film maker, Chioma has produced/co-produced over 8 movies including the award-nominated blockbuster On Bended Knees. Chioma Chukwuka is also a public speaker and mentor.

Masterclass With Chioma 
In January 2019, she announced the launch of a capacity-building platform called Masterclass With Chioma, where aspiring talents, especially actors, are taught by seasoned filmmakers, screenwriters, actors and other industry professionals on what it takes to make it in the film, TV, and theatre industries.

Endorsement deals
Chioma Akpotha became the brand ambassador for Erisco Foods in November 2018. Chioma Chukwuka has served as a brand ambassador for a number of Nigerian and international commercial brands, including Globacom Nigeria, a telecommunications company, Omo Detergent and Harpic Cleaner.

Personal life
Chioma Chukwuka married Franklyn Akpotha in 2006.

Filmography

As actress 
 2000: The Apple
 2000: Three Musketeers 
 2000: Handkerchief 
 2002: Sunrise
 2002: The Final Clash
 2003: Disguise
 2003: Handsome
 2003: Real Love
 2003: Romantic Attraction
 2004: Foul Play
 2004: Unbroken Promise
 2004: Two Become One
 2004: Promise & Fail
 2004: Legacy
 2004: Home Sickness
 2004: Heavy Rain
 2004: Circle of Tears
 2005: War for War
 2005: Years of Tears
 2005: Sins of the Flesh – Chukwuka won the African Movie Academy Award in 2007 for Best Actress for her role in this movie
 2005: Second Adam
 2005: Sacred Tradition
 2005: Real Love 2
 2005: Real Love 3
 2005: Moment of Truth
 2005: Knowing You
 2005: Golden Moon
 2005: Azima
 2005: Fake Angel
 2005: Eagle's Bride
 2005: The Bridesmaid
 2006: Wisdom of the Gods
 2006: Zoza
 2006: Traumatized
 2006: Total Crisis
 2006: Tears in My Heart
 2006: Strange Love
 2006: Sound of Love
 2006: Serpent in Paradise
 2006: Saviour
 2006: The Saint
 2006: Royal Insult
 2006: Royal Doom
 2006: On My Wedding Day
 2006: Naked Sin
 2006: On My Wedding Day
 2006: Last Dance
 2006: Holy Family
 2006: Games Men Play || Directed by Lancelot Oduwa Imasuen
 2006: End of Discussion
 2006: Desperate Ambition
 2006: Dead in Faith
 2006: Chinwe Okeke
 2006: Asunder
 2006: Ass on Fire
 2006: Death In Faith
 2007: Double Game
 2008: Red Soil
 2008: World Of Our Own
 2008: Wind Of Sorrow
 2009: Odum Na Akwaeke
 2011: The Throne Is Mine
 2011: Nne Ifedigo
 2012: Cry No More
 2013: On Bended Knees
 2014: Heart Of Gold
 2014: Warrior Sisters
 2014: Aziza
 2014: Warrior Sisters
 2014: Sabina Makosa
 2014: Magic Dragon
 2014: Unforgiven
 2014: Police On Duty
 2014: Village Commando
 2014: Nwaogo The House Maid
 2015: Agbaranze
 2015: Ezi Nwa Di Uko
 2015: Rain Of Hope
 2015: Chinasa My Love
 2015: Nwanyi Nnewi
 2015: Kamsi The Freedom Fighter
 2015: The Lioness
 2015: Amarachi
 2015: Coffin Business
 2015: Anelka
 2015: Udu Bundle
 2016: Rain Of Hope
 2016: Evil Coffin
 2016: Genesis Of Love
 2016: The Flute Boy
 2016: Marriage Crisis
 2016: Sister Maria
 2016: Akwaeke
 2016: Wives On Strike I
 2017: Evil Culture
 2017: 2nd Coming Of Christ
 2017: Innocent Murderer
 2017: My Mother My Pain
 2017: All For Love
 2017: Heart of Ulimma
 2017: King Uremma
 2017: Reign Of Truth
 2017: God Of Liberation
 2017: My Mother
 2017: Jehovah Witness
 2017: Local Queen
 2017: Somto
 2017: Christmas Is Coming
 2017: Choked
 2017: Bird Watcher
 2017: Village Champion
 2017: The Unforeseen Truth
 2017: Dangerous Confession
 2017: Innocent Murderer
 2017: The Tradition
 2017: Broken Vow
 2017: Beyond Trust
 2017: Tender Heart
 2018: Sound of Wisdom
 2018: Let Me Love You 1
 2018: Let Me Love You 2
 2018: Deeper Than Pain
 2018: Desperate Twins
 2018: In Love Again After Heartbreak 1
 2018: In Love Again After Heartbreak 2
 2018: My Drum of Love 1
 2018: My Drum of Love 2
 2018: Life After Marriage
 2018: Immortal Love 1
 2018: Immortal Love 2
 2018: Cause for Love 1
 2018: Cause for Love 2
 2018: Cause for Love 3
 2018: Cause for Love 4
 2018: Cause for Love 5
 2018: Cause for Love 6
 2018: The Ghost and the Tout
 2018: Lara And The Beat
 2019: Void
 2019: For Want Of A Queen
 2019: In Your Dreams
 2019: The Street Kid
 2019: Rain of LOVE
 2019: Dark Cloud
 2020: Nneka The Pretty Serpent
 2020: Omo Ghetto: The Saga

As producer 
 2013: On Bended Knees
 2016: Cry of the Dead
 2017: Choked
 2017: Bird Watcher
 2019: For Want Of A Queen
 2019: In Your Dreams
 2019: Rain of LOVE
 2019: Dark Cloud

Awards and nominations

See also
 List of Nigerian actors
 List of Nigerian film producers
 List of Nigerian film directors

References

External links 
 

1980 births
Living people
Actresses from Anambra State
Best Actress Africa Movie Academy Award winners
Igbo actresses
21st-century Nigerian actresses
Lagos State University alumni
Participants in Nigerian reality television series
Nigerian film directors
Nigerian film producers
Nigerian television personalities